Qaemabad-e Razzaqzadeh (also Romanized as Qā’emābād-e Razzāqzādeh; also known as Qā’emābād, Ebrāhīmābād, Gha’em Abad, Qāimabad, and Qāyemābād) is a village in Shusef Rural District, Shusef District, Nehbandan County, South Khorasan Province, Iran. At the 2006 census, its population was 32, in 6 families.

References 

Populated places in Nehbandan County